Cook with the book is an 8-episode Uruguayan documentary television series premiered in 2019 on TNU and TV Ciudad. The show stars chef Penélope Miranda, directed by Gustavo Hernández and produced by Emanuel K. Miranda.

Plot 
This TV series collects the basic premises to cook and eat better through the teaching of techniques, tips and secrets of cooking and nutrition within other hints to better living. A culinary trip through South America guided by some of the best chefs of the world.  

A space to learn, know and discover new food, ways of preparation, culture and tradition. Cooking classes that go beyond A, B, C of how to cook and look forward to the basic knowledge of what to cook, and why.

Following the step by step of simple recipes we will be knitting a story involving our way of eating, social trends and personal habits. A long lasting learning experience with new acknowledgement that can be applied every day introducing new habits that will affect our health in a positive way.

Production 
The series won the Fund for the Promotion of Film by the Audiovisual Direction of Uruguay. It featured the participation of 8 of the most influential chefs in Latin America: renowned Colombian chef Leo Espinosa, Slow Food representative in Uruguay Laura Rosano, chef specializing in Amazonian cuisine Thiago Castanho, Argentine writer Natalia Kiako, Aurelien Bondoux chef of La Bourgogne in Punta del Este, Verá, an indigenous person of Guaraní origin, the Brazilian culinary expert Bela Gil, and Pilar Rodríguez, gastronomic ambassador of Chile. The series was declared of cultural interest by the Ministry of Education and Culture of Uruguay, and in 2018 it participated in the Cannes MIPTV festival.

Episodes

Season 1

References

External links 

 
 Teaser - Uruguay National Television
 Official trailer
 Gustavo Hernandez - AlloCiné

Uruguayan television series
Spanish-language television shows
Canal 5 (Uruguay) original programming